James George Anson Butler, 5th Marquess of Ormonde (18 April 1890 – 21 June 1949) was the son of James Arthur Wellington Foley Butler, 4th Marquess of Ormonde and American heiress Ellen Stager, daughter of Union General Anson Stager.

Biography
Upon the death of his uncle, James Butler, 3rd Marquess of Ormonde, Lord Ossory (as he was known after his uncle's death) inherited the family seat of Kilkenny Castle and several other estates traditionally owned by the Marquess of Ormonde. This was made in an attempt to avoid burdening the Estate with death duties for both the 3rd and 4th Marquesses. His father, the 4th Marquess, was supported by the independent wealth of his American wife, Ellen Stager.

The last member of the family to live there, Lord Ossory (as he was known at the time) and his family left Kilkenny Castle in 1935 and resided in London. The contents of the castle were sold in 1935 and the castle was left neglected. The Ormonde Estates had been in gradual financial decline since the late 1800's; whilst income had been as high as approximately £45,000 in the 1890's, this had fallen to approximately £9,000 in 1930. A number of family charges also drained the falling income of the estate; between 1919 and 1927, this averaged between £2,500 and £4,500. The Will of the 3rd Marquess made provision for £3,000 respective annual charges for his widow, Elizabeth, Marchioness of Ormonde, and his brother the 4th Marquess, as well as a £275 for his younger brother Lord Theobald Butler, which was also payable to Lord Theobald's wife Annabella in the event of his death. The cost of maintaining Kilkenny Castle also put a strain on finances; in 1904 this amount was some £4,400, but this had fallen to £2,166 in the 1920's, and approximately £1,200 in the early 1930's. Lord Ossory's (as the 5th Marquess of Ormonde was then known) decision to vacate the Castle in the mid-1930's reflects the family's difficults in maintaining such a large house.

In 1939 Lord and Lady Ossory were recorded as living in inner-northern London at 30 St John's Wood Park. Despite the reduced circumstances of the family, a Butler, Cook, Housemaid, Kitchenmaid, and Lady's Maid were also recorded as living at this address.

Lord and Lady Ossory hosted a large ball at the London townhouse of the Marquess and Marchioness of Ormonde, 11 Bryanston Square, in June 1938. This dance was a joint coming-of-age party for their son Anthony Viscount Thurles, as well as a debutant 'coming-out' party for the daughter Lady Moyra. The guest list reported in newspapers at the time provides some insight into the high social standing of the Butler family; among the guests who accepted invitations were the United States Ambassador Joseph Kennedy (father of US President John F. Kennedy) and his daughter Kathleen (later Marchioness of Hartlington), The Earl and Countess of Airlie, Queen Victoria's grandson the Marquess of Carisbrooke, Viscount and Viscountess Curzon, Earl and Countess FitzWilliam, Earl and Countess Spencer, the Duke and Duchess of Marlborough, the Duchess of Northumberland, and the Earl and Countess of Shrewsbury.

George Butler, 5th Marquess of Ormonde died on 21 June 1949. His gross estate was valued at £26,884; however his net estate was valued at £0.

Marriage and descendants
He married Hon. Sybil Inna Mildred Fellowes, daughter of William Henry Fellowes, 2nd Baron de Ramsey and Lady Rosamond Fellowes, Baroness de Ramsey, on 23 February 1915. The Fellowes and Butlers seem to have been old family friends; George's grandmother Frances, Marchioness of Ormonde, attended the wedding of Sybil's parents in 1877. His parents, then Lord and Lady Arthur Butler, settled an annuity of £1,100 on George and Sybil, with £600 to be paid to Sybil for her life if George predeceased her. Sybil received a dowry of £2,000 from her father Lord de Ramsay, an annuity of £400, and a fifth-share of her mother's £30,000 marriage settlement to be paid on her mother's death as part of the settlement. In 1929 Lady Ormonde settled an additional £15,000 in Trust to George and Sybil, which provided for an additional £400 annuity for Sybil in the event of George's death. They had two children:
James Anthony Butler, Viscount Thurles (1916–1940), died unmarried serving in Second World War as Driver, Royal Army Service Corps
Lady Moyra Butler (1920–1959) married (1) Charles Weld-Forester and (2) Count Guy van den Steen de Jehay.
 Piers Weld-Forester (b. 1946)
 Gerard van den Steen (b. 1949) (m. Patricia Delloye)
 Moyra van den Steen 
 Ségolène van den Steen
 Géraldine van den Steen

Upon the death of George's uncle, James Butler, 3rd Marquess of Ormonde, George's father Arthur succeeded as 4th Marquess of Ormonde, and George and Sybil were permitted use of the courtesy titles Earl and Countess of Ossory. Lord and Lady Ossory were recorded as living at 19 Gloucester Place, St Marylebone, London in 1920.

Lady Ormonde's mother, Lady Rosamond Spencer-Churchill was the daughter of John Spencer-Churchill, 7th Duke of Marlborough, the aunt of Charles Spencer-Churchill, 9th Duke of Marlborough (who was married to the most famous of the American 'Dollar Princesses', Consuelo Vanderbilt) and the sister of Lord Randolph Churchill, father of British Prime Minister Winston Churchill. Lady Ormonde was therefore the first cousin of Winston Churchill.

Butler fought and was wounded in the First World War. His only son predeceased him during the Second, so he was succeeded by his brother James Butler, 6th Marquess of Ormonde.

Lady Moyra married, firstly, Charles Weld-Forester (who was the son of Major Hon. Edric Weld-Forester (who in turn was the son of the 5th Baron Forester of Willey Park) and Lady Victoria Wynn-Carington (who was the daughter of the 1st Marquess of Lincolnshire and a Lady-in-Waiting to Mary of Teck) on 20 April 1940. They had one son, Piers Edric Weld-Forester. The couple were divorced in 1948, and on 3 August of the same year, she married Count Guy Jacques van den Steen de Jehay, a Belgian nobleman.

Lord Ormonde's descendants include two grandsons and three great-granddaughters. His elder grandson Piers Weld-Forester was a prominent figure in London society in the late 1960s and early 1970s. Described as a 'playboy in the true sense of the word', he was briefly the boyfriend of Princess Anne in 1971 and went on to become a motorcycle racer. He was killed in a motorcycle crash in 1977. During his lifetime, Piers was one of the last remaining male members of the Butler Dynasty, along with his great-uncle Arthur Butler, 6th Marquess of Ormonde and first cousin twice-removed Charles Butler, 7th Marquess of Ormonde. Upon the transfer of the family's ancestral home Kilkenny Castle to the local government in 1967, the remainder of the Ormonde Family Trust was wound up and split equally between the 6th Marquess, Charles Butler (later 7th Marquess) and Piers.

References

External links
 

1890 births
1949 deaths
George
George
British Army personnel of World War I
British Life Guards officers
Deputy Lieutenants of Kilkenny